Seyit Torun (born 1 February 1968) is a Turkish economist and politician from Republican People's Party (CHP), who has served as a  Member of Parliament for Ordu since 7 June 2015.

Early life and career 
Seyit Torun was born in Ordu on 1 February 1968 to Hikmet Torun and his wife Sahinur. Torun completed his high school education in Ordu. He graduated from Atatürk University in 1990.

Political career

Member of Parliament
Torun was elected as a CHP Member of Parliament for Ordu in the June 2015 general election. He was re-elected in November 2015.

References 

Living people
1968 births
People from Ordu
Atatürk University alumni
Turkish economists
Contemporary Republican People's Party (Turkey) politicians